Nikolai A. Golovkinsky (29 April 1834 – 1897) was a Russian geologist who studied among other things the Paleozoic sediments of Tatarstan. He was professor at the Kazan School of Geology.

References

Russian geologists
1834 births
1897 deaths